Ben Houchen (born 9 December 1986) is an English politician serving as the Tees Valley Mayor since May 2017.

A member of the Conservative Party, Houchen represents the five Tees Valley local authority areas of Middlesbrough, Stockton-on-Tees, Redcar and Cleveland, Hartlepool and Darlington. He also acts as chairman of the Tees Valley Combined Authority, the body that drives economic growth and job creation in the area.

As part of his mayoral campaign, Houchen promised to bring Teesside International Airport (then Durham Tees Valley Airport) back into its previous name and public ownership. In December 2018 Houchen announced that a £40 million deal to buy the airport had been reached with The Peel Group. The acquisition was unanimously approved by the Tees Valley Combined Authority Cabinet in January 2019. In 2021, Houchen was re-elected for a second term.

Early life 
Born in Stockton-on-Tees, Houchen grew up in Ingleby Barwick. He attended Conyers School in Yarm before studying law at Northumbria University in Newcastle upon Tyne. He is the nephew of Keith Houchen, a former football player for Coventry City F.C.

Political career 
Houchen was a councillor on Stockton-on-Tees Borough Council, representing Yarm ward, between 2011 and 2017. In 2012 he stood as the Conservative parliamentary candidate in the Middlesbrough by-election. In the 2014 European Parliament elections, Houchen was the Conservative candidate for the North East region.

Houchen was selected as the Conservative Party candidate for Mayor of the Tees Valley in December 2016. Upon taking office, he became entitled to the style of Mayor.

In 2019, he appeared on LBC's list of the 'Top 100 Most Influential Conservatives', at number 100. He was accused of pork barrel politics in the runup to the Hartlepool byelection of 2021.

At the 2021 Tees Valley mayoral election, Houchen was re-elected with 72.8% of the vote.

Durham Tees Valley Airport 

In December 2018 Houchen announced a £40 million deal had been agreed to buy Peel Airports' 89% majority shareholding in Durham Tees Valley Airport, bringing the airport back into public ownership for the first time since it was sold to Peel in 2003. On 24 January the plan was unanimously approved by the Tees Valley Combined Authority Cabinet.

Purchasing the airport was Houchen's primary election pledge in his campaign in the 2017 Tees Valley mayoral election. As of 2021 the cost of bringing the airport back into public control stood at £40 million.

South Tees Development Corporation 
The South Tees Development Corporation (STDC) is the first Mayoral Development Corporation outside of London. Chaired by Houchen, the STDC area covers approximately 4,500 acres of land to the south of the River Tees, in the Borough of Redcar and Cleveland, and includes former SSI steelworks site as well as other industrial assets. The area includes the deep-water port of Teesport. The STDC aims to create approximately 20,000 new jobs and contribute £1 billion per annum into the UK economy by 2025. However, as of late 2021, the economic impact of the port has been described as 'speculative' by a member of the management board.

In January 2019, Houchen announced that a deal had been reached to acquire 1,420 acres of land on the STDC site from Tata Steel Europe. The acquisition was signed off in February 2019.

Consequently, he was one of the figures responsible in 2021 for the controversial demolition of the landmark Brutalist Dorman Long Tower, after lodging an appeal against its recent granting of a Grade II listing. He later accused the Historic England official who listed the structure as being a junior member of staff, who had acted without the permission of senior managers. This was later robustly denied by Historic England who released a statement saying "The mayor’s statement is incorrect - the listing was not a mistake. Historic England advised DCMS to list the site. Following a site visit, our advice to list the site remained the same".

Personal life 
Houchen lives in Yarm with his wife Rachel, an ex French teacher at Conyers School. He is the nephew of ex-professional footballer Keith Houchen who scored the equalising goal for Coventry City in the 1987 FA Cup Final.

References

Mayors of the Tees Valley
1986 births
Living people
Alumni of Northumbria University
Conservative Party (UK) mayors